Stanleyville is an unincorporated community between northern Winston-Salem and Rural Hall in Forsyth County, North Carolina, United States. Most of the community has been annexed by Winston-Salem. Stanleyville is located along North Carolina Highway 66 near the future Interstate 74 interchange with U.S. Route 52.  It is home to many farms and recently has seen a surge in commercial expansion.  It does not have a post office, so all mail is routed through adjoining Rural Hall.

References

Unincorporated communities in Forsyth County, North Carolina
Unincorporated communities in North Carolina
Geography of Winston-Salem, North Carolina